Qingdao Red Lions Football Club is a professional football club and academy from Qingdao in Shandong province, China. The first team has its home base in Laixi city, with youth training taking part in Laixi and several districts of Qingdao. Former notable players include David Löfquist, Kwame Quansah, Milan Perić, Shi Hanjun and Qiu Zhonghui. 
 
Qingdao Red Lions was established in early 2016. The first team joined the Chinese amateur league system that year and won promotion to the professional China League Two in 2018. The club aims to contribute to the development of Chinese football, both on youth level as in competitive league football.

Club badge and colours
The club badge consists of a shield containing a lion's head —a symbol for strength— and Wuyue Feng (May Wind), the iconic monument on Qingdao's May Fourth Square.
The 2020 home and away kit for Qingdao Red Lions are designed and manufactured by Guangzhou-based sports clothing and equipment producer UCAN.

Stadium and training ground
From the start of the 2020 season, the first team play its games in the stadium at Laixi Sports Center, which was built for the 2015 Leisure Games. The stadium is facilitated with a natural grass pitch and has a capacity of 10.000 seats. Training takes places at separate training pitches at the same Laixi Sports Center.

During the 2019 China League Two season Qingdao Red Lions played its home games in the Zhonglian Sports Center in the northern Jimo district of Qingdao. In the 2017 Qingdao Super League the club played its home games at the newly developed football pitch within the Fushan Mountain Ecological Park. In the 2016 football season Qingdao Red Lions played their home games in a stadium with 10.000 seat capacity, located on the premises of a factory in Chengyang district.

Players

Current squad

Coaching staff

Management
 Piet van der Pol (President)
 Esti Lestari (CEO)
 Lon Weijers (COO)
 Anna Zhang (Commercial Affairs)
 Hector Buraglia (Head of Youth Academy)

Former notable head coaches

Results
2019 China FA Cup Tournament:  Qingdao Red Lions beat Chongqing High Wave in the first round, then got eliminated in the second round by Zhejiang Yiteng after a penalty shoot out.
2018 Qingdao FA Cup Tournament: Qingdao Fortschritt Red Lions reached the semi finals, in which it drew with Qingdao Yinglian (1–1), but lost the penalty shoot out.
2018 Qingdao City Super League: Qingdao Red Lions finish 2nd.
2018 CFA MA Champions League finals: In the 2018 season the competition was re-branded China FA Member Associations Champions League (CMCL). Qingdao Fortschritt Red Lions in August finished second in the regional final (group 4 North) and qualified for the national finals stage. In the finals, the Red Lions lost 0–1 home and 2–1 away against Lhasa Urban Construction, after which they finished 15th.
2017 Qingdao FA Cup Tournament: Qingdao Fortschritt Red Lions reached the semi finals, in which it lost to Qingdao Yinglian (0–1).
2017 Qingdao City Super League (6 teams): Qingdao Fortschritt Red Lions finished second in the league, one point behind champions MaiDiShen.
2017 China Amateur Football League Finals: Qingdao Fortschritt Red Lions qualified for the regional final tournament in Zibo, Shandong province. It finished second after wins against JinZhong (9–0) and Luoyang (2–1) and a loss against Zibo Sunday (0–1), meaning the team did not qualify for the final phase of the national finals.
2016 Qingdao FA Cup Tournament: Qingdao Red Lions did not participate.
2016 Qingdao City Super League (6 teams): Qingdao Red Lions finished in third place, qualifying for 2016 China Amateur League finals.
2016 China Amateur Football League Finals: Qingdao Red Lions played the Southeast Regional final tournament that took place October 1–7 in Shanghai. It did not qualify for the national stage phase.

All-time league rankings
As of the end of 2019 season.

 In group stage.
 
Key
 Pld = Played
 W = Games won
 D = Games drawn
 L = Games lost
 F = Goals for
 A = Goals against
 Pts = Points
 Pos = Final position

 DNQ = Did not qualify
 DNE = Did not enter
 NH = Not Held
 – = Does Not Exist
 R1 = Round 1
 R2 = Round 2
 R3 = Round 3
 R4 = Round 4

 F = Final
 SF = Semi-finals
 QF = Quarter-finals
 R16 = Round of 16
 Group = Group stage
 GS2 = Second Group stage
 QR1 = First Qualifying Round
 QR2 = Second Qualifying Round
 QR3 = Third Qualifying Round

Youth Academy

Qingdao Red Lions Youth Academy has established three youth training centers in Laixi city and the Laoshan and Licang districts of Qingdao, with a total of more than 200 registered players. Qingdao Red Lions Youth Academy is led by UEFA A LEVEL professional coach Hector Buraglia from Spain. The academy coaching staff consists of AFC qualified local coaches. With the support of the Laixi Government and the local Education and Sports Bureau, Qingdao Red Lions FC is carrying out in-depth cooperation with schools to build out the club's youth development structure, and respectively make a strong contribution to develop local youth football talent.

Academy Notable Players
-Chen Yongbin – A-League – Adelaide United

In 2019 Chen Yongbin was transferred to Adelaide United, where he was registered for the 2020 A-League season.

References

External links
Official website
 

Football clubs in China
Sport in Qingdao